Emmy Award for Outstanding Drama Series may refer to the following Emmy Awards:

 Primetime Emmy Award for Outstanding Drama Series
 Daytime Emmy Award for Outstanding Drama Series
 International Emmy Award for Best Drama Series

Emmy Awards